Pierre Vervloesem is a Belgian avant-garde guitar player and producer, and has been described as Belgium's Frank Zappa.

Career
After playing in a handful of experimental rock bands in the early 1990s, Vervloesem joined avant-garde band X-Legged Sally at the invitation of Michel Mast. During that collaboration, he appeared on the band's albums: Slow-Up (1991), Killed by Charity (1994), Eggs and Ashes (1995), and The Land of the Giant Dwarfs and the live swan song Fired (both 1996). Since then, he has been a musical partner of Peter Vermeersch in many musical expeditions, both as a performer and as a producer, for example in A Group and the theatre production Weg (by Josse De Pauw). Together Vervloesem and Vermeersch produced the first LP by Antwerp rock group dEUS.

Vervloesem has also released several solo LPs where he experiments with unusual instruments (e.g. shaking a crate of empty beer bottles as percussion) and unfamiliar sounds to create what are essentially quite simple songs. One of Vervloessem's main influences is revealed by a song on the 1994 release Home Made, consisting of one minute of silence in memory of Frank Zappa. But tellingly, the same album also contains a cover of John Barry's composition "Ski Chase", from the soundtrack of the James Bond film, On her Majesty's Secret Service. In 2002, Vervloesem released an album of cover versions of John Barry tracks.

Playing style
Vervloesem's guitar playing style has been associated with that of: Nick Didkovsky, Fred Frith, Zappa, Nels Cline, Joe Satriani, and Steve Vai.

Discography

 Home Made (1994)
 Fiasco (1996)
 Chef d'Oeuvre (1999)
 Zala Zala (2000), with John Litton Baraï
 ...plays John Barry (2002)
 Grosso Modo (2002)
 Rude (2005)
 Not Even Close (2008)
 Unchained Melodies (2009), by Kings of Belgium
 Sketches of Pain (2010), by Caca
 John Koenig (2010)
 Grotesque (2010), by Codswallop
 Très fort (2011), by Kings of Belgium
 On dirait du singe (2012), by Ray Pinson
 Silence Science (2013)
 A Carbon Copy of Secrets (2020), a cover of Pink Floyd's A Saucerful of Secrets (1968)

References

External links
 The (un)official home page of Pierre Vervloesem
 Pierre Vervloesem om MySpace

Living people
Year of birth missing (living people)
Belgian musicians
Avant-garde guitarists
Progressive rock guitarists
21st-century Belgian musicians
20th-century Belgian musicians
X-Legged Sally members